The 2011–2012 will be the 64th in the club's history. It will also be their debut season in Segunda División, the second tier of Spanish football. The club will compete in the Liga Adelante and Copa del Rey.

Season overview

July
Guadalajara geared up for their debut in Segunda División over the summer by adding 10 new players to the squad in hopes of repeating back-to-back promotions.

On 19 July, Jonan García, Ander Gago, Cristian Fernández and Joseba Arriaga were presented as new Guadalajara players.

On 25 July, young goalkeeper Javier González Nieto joined the club from Valencia B.

On 26 July, Víctor Fernández Maza became the sixth signing when he joined from Celta Vigo. Capped by the Spain U20 team and game experience in the Segunda División, Fernández stated "he is ready to fight for a spot on the team and the team shows lots of promise."

August
On 4 August, Guadalajara signed midfielder Jonathan Ñíguez from Las Palmas for the next 2 seasons.

On 18 August, Guadalajara capture French defender Mickaël Gaffoor from Celta Vigo. He stated "when the opportunity was presented to play in Segunda División, I could not give it a second thought."

On 19 August, the Association of Spanish Footballers (AFE) went on strike due to unpaid wages for players in the top two divisions of Spanish football by clubs who have gone into financial administration. The AFE and Liga de Fútbol Profesional (LFP) have yet to agree on a guaranteed fund to protect players' wages in the event of their clubs being declared insolvent. The strike forced Spanish league games scheduled for the weekend of August 20 and 21, including Guadalajara's season opener against Numancia, to be postponed.

On 27 August, Guadalajara started their league season with a 1–1 draw at Estadio Pedro Escartín against Las Palmas after their Match 1 was postponed to 26 October.

On 30 August, midfielder Rodrigo Suárez Peña, better known as Rodri, completed his move to Guadalajara. He stated "it seems like a great group, together we'll try to reach our goals."

September
On 1 September, Guadalajara signed Scottish forward Ryan Harper from Real Betis B. The 24-year-old player stated "he was happy of how well he was received, and how friendly and comfortable his new club has made him."

On 3 September, Guadalajara notched their first ever win and first one on the road in Segunda División with a 0–2 victory against Xerez.

On 7 September, Guadalajara were eliminated from the Copa del Rey by Almería with a 2–0 defeat in extra time.

On 24 September, Guadalajara defeated Cartagena 2–0 to take over 1st place in the Liga Adelante standings for the first time in their history.

October
The month started with Guadalajara losing back-to-back fixtures including a heavy 4–0 defeat at Riazor against Deportivo La Coruña. The following Match Day, the club lost 1–2 at home to Hércules and also lost Ryan Harper with a rupture of the anterior cruciate ligament in his left knee.

Current squad
As of 29 January 2012.

Transfers

In

Out

Team Stats

|}
Last updated on 29 January.

Season results

League table

Results summary

Results by round

Pre-season
Kickoff times are in CET.

Liga Adelante
Kickoff times are in CET.

Copa del Rey

Kickoff times are in CET.

References

External links
 

Guadalajara
CD Guadalajara (Spain) seasons